Streamtuner is a streaming media directory browser. Through the use of a C/Python plugin system, it offers a GTK+ 2.0 interface to Internet radio directories.  Streamtuner does not actually play any files, it downloads a list of online radio streams and then tells the unix player (user's option) to play the selected stream.  Streamtuner offers hundreds of thousands of music resources in a more common interface.

Streamtuner is free software, released under the terms of the revised BSD license.

There is also a version for the Nokia 770 Internet tablet.

The still developed Streamtuner2 mimics Streamtuner.

Features of Streamtuner

 Browse the SHOUTcast Yellow Pages
 Browse the Live365 directory
 Browse the Xiph.org (aka icecast.org, aka Oddsock) directory
 Browse the basic.ch DJ mixes
 Manage your local music collection, with full support for ID3 and Vorbis metadata editing
 Listen to streams (through unix player), browse their web page, or record them using programs such as Streamripper
 Implement new directory handlers as tiny Python scripts or as dynamically loadable modules written in C
 Retain your favourite streams by bookmarking them
 Manually add streams to your collection

Streamtuner in the press

 UnixReview.com: Marcel's Linux App of the Month: Streamtuner (July 2005)
 Tux Magazine: Streamtuner (July 2005)
 
 Orange Crate: Audiophiles' Solution For Net Radio (April 2004)

References

External links

 Streamtuner homepage

Unix Internet software
Free audio software